St. John the Baptist is a 1438 carved painters wood altarpiece by the Florentine early renaissance sculptor Donatello. It was created for and to this day still located in the Basilica Santa Maria Gloriosa dei Frari in Campo del Friari in the San Polo district of Venice, Italy.

The sculpture was restored in 1973 at which time the sculptor's signature and dating of the work were rediscovered. It is the sculptor's only work in Venice.  Although the original installation of the statue is unclear, it is presently located on the altar of the chapel of the Florentine community in the Basilica dei Frari, on the right side of the transept.

In the work the saint is depicted in a hair shirt with animal pelts with golden cloak atop.  Meanwhile from John's right hand extends a scroll unfurled which reads “ECCE AGNUS DEI” (En: behold the lamb of God) .

References

1430s in art
Sculptures by Donatello
Italian Renaissance 
Sculptures depicting John the Baptist